Just Ballade (stylized as JUST BALLADE) is the ninth studio album by Japanese singer Misia. It was released on December 16, 2009 by Ariola Japan, marking Misia's first album release under the label. The album yielded seven singles, "Yes Forever" and "Yakusoku no Tsubasa", released in 2008, the digital exclusive "Sukoshi Zutsu Taisetsu ni", the double A-side single "Ginga" / "Itsumademo", "Aitakute Ima", and lastly "Hoshi no Yō ni...", released on the same day as the album. Just Ballade was certified Gold by the Recording Industry Association of Japan.

Background and release
Fresh off The Tour of Misia Discotheque Asia, where the musical emphasis was on lively, uptempo dance music, Misia wanted a change of pace with the next album. She was inspired by the positive feedback she received from concert audiences in relation to the ballad section of her Discotheque Asia setlist, and set out to make an album that could recreate the same "well-filled quiet" that garnered such a favorable reception. As the title of the album suggests, Just Ballade consists predominantly of ballads, however not all tracks on the record are slow-tempo songs. In an interview with Excite, Misia explained the varied tempo and sound of the album by stating that, while people might have a general preconception of what a ballad will sound like, it's not as clear cut. She remarks that, to her, what makes a song a ballad isn't the piano or the orchestra, but whether the song can move her to tears.

Just Ballade is Misia's first studio album in close two years, since Eighth World. It was issued in Blu-spec CD format and released in three different versions, a standard CD-only edition, and two limited editions. Limited edition "A" comes packaged in a CD sleeve with a different cover art and includes a DVD featuring six music videos, while limited edition "B" is packaged in a pop-up case, also with an alternate cover art, housed in a clear sleeve and comes with a 28-page color booklet.

In addition to the singles, several album tracks were also used in promotional campaigns leading up to their release. "Chiheisen no Mukōgawa e" served as ending theme to the TX news program World Business Satellite, "Boku no Kimochi" as ending theme to the AX variety show Himitsu no Kenmin Show, and "Work It Out" as ending theme to the AX news program Jōhō Live Miyaneya.

Critical reception

CDJournal critics remarked that the listener should not take the title of the album too literally, as the album includes many styles of ballads. They noted that the sound on the record is "perfected to the last detail". Misia was praised for her powerful vocal performance, with critics describing it as "transportive". Adam Greenberg of AllMusic, pronounced Misia's voice to be the "star of the show", but also noted that she can sometimes go overboard and overpower the sensibility of the ballad. Writing for Bounce, Aokinoko described Just Ballade as a "love song collection" basking in the "essence of many different styles." Aokinoko praised the record as "stimulating", singled out "Aitakute Ima", "Ginga" and "Call Me Love Me" as the standout tracks, and called it the "perfect lovers' soundtrack".

Commercial performance
Just Ballade entered the daily Oricon Albums Chart at number 3, selling 18,000 copies on its first day.
 It slid to number 4 the following day, where it stayed for the rest of the week. The album debuted at number 4 on the weekly Oricon Albums Chart, selling 57,000 copies. It also debuted at number 4 on the Billboard Japan Top Albums Sales chart. The album fell to number 8 on its second week on the Oricon chart, logging sales of 33,000 copies. Just Ballade charted for twenty-one non-consecutive weeks on the Oricon Albums Chart, selling a reported total of 143,000 copies during its run.

Track listing

Credits and personnel
Personnel

 Lead vocals, production – Misia
 Backing vocals – Misia, Bennie Diggs, George Hodnett, JP, Fonzi Thornton, Vaneese Thomas, Crystal McGee, Marcia Sapp Salter
 Songwriting – Misia, Sinkiroh, Jun Sasaki, Hinata, JP, Toshiaki Matsumoto, Shusui, Carl Utbult, Fredrik Hult, Tebey
 Backing vocal arrangement – JP, Sinkiroh, Jun Sasaki, Misia, Gomi, Bennie Diggs
 Arrangement – Tohru Shigemi, Jun Sasaki, JP, Sinkiroh, Gomi, Carl Utbult, Fredrik Hult
 Orchestral arrangement – Gen Ittetsu, Dan Miyakawa
 Strings arrangement – Tohru Shigemi, Gen Ittetsu
 Piano – Tohru Shigemi
 Guitar – Hirokazu Ogura, Robin Macatangay, Masato Ishinari, Kazumi Watanabe, Fredrik Hult, Shuhei Yamaguchi
 Sitar – Masato Ishinari
 Bass – Takeshi Taneda, Richie Goods
 Acoustic bass – Richie Goods
 Acoustic guitar – Shuhei Yamaguchi
 Electric guitar – Takashi Yamaguchi
 Electric keyboard – Gomi, Henry Hey, Tohru Shigemi, Carl Utbult
 Keyboard programming – Carl Utbult
 Drums – Robert Di Pietro, Harvey Mason
 Drum programming – Gomi

 Percussion – Samuel Torres
 Kalimba – Hiromi Kondo
 Djembe – Masaya Oonishi
 Strings – Gen Ittetsu Strings, Crusher Kimura Strings
 Cello – Masami Horisawa
 Harp – Tomoyuki Asakawa
 English horn – Hiroshi Shibayama
 French horn – Hiroyuki Minami, Hiroyuki Nakajima, Otohiko Fujita, Yasushi Katsumata, Kenshow Hagiwara
 Flugelhorn – Tony Kadleck
 Flute – Hideyo Takakuwa, Tasuo Yamamoto
 Fagotto – Toshiki Takei
 Harmonica – Russell Graham
 All other instruments – Jun Sasaki, Sinkiroh, Tohru Shigemi, Masayuki Kumahara, Gomi
 Engineering – Yoshikazu Nakabayashi, Dave Darlington, Ken Nishi, Masahiro Kawaguchi, Sui, Masashi Hashimoto, Akira Kusayanagi, Sebastien Plassais, Andrew Hey
 Mixing – Yoshikazu Nakabayashi, Dave Darlington, Masashi Hashimoto, Shojiro Watanabe, Masashi Matsubayashi, David Thoener
 Mastering – Herb Powers Jr.

Charts

Daily and weekly charts

Monthly and year-end charts

Certification and sales

Release history

References

External links
 Just Ballade Special Site

2009 albums
Misia albums
Ariola Japan albums